The Merchant Shipping Act 1988 c.12 was an Act of Parliament of the United Kingdom. It aimed to prevent foreign fishing fleets from fishing in British territorial waters. In the Factortame case, its provisions in Parts I and II, Registration of British Ships, were disapplied by the Judicial functions of the European court of justice when they were found to conflict with European Community law and the Common Fisheries Policy which stated British waters were the EUs too.  Part II dealt only with fishing vessels and was found to be repugnant by the European Court of Justice. The subsequent definition of British Ships is found in the Merchant Shipping Act 1995.

See also
Merchant Shipping Act

External links
 The text of the statute as amended and (not) in force today from the Statute Law Database

United Kingdom Acts of Parliament 1988
Shipping in the United Kingdom
Fisheries law